The Ninety-ninth Amendment of the Constitution of India, officially known as The Constitution (Ninety-ninth Amendment) Act, 2014, formed a National Judicial Appointments Commission. 16 State assemblies out of 29 States including Goa, Rajasthan, Tripura, Gujarat and Telangana ratified the Central Legislation, enabling the President of India to give assent to the bill. The amendment was struck down by the Supreme Court on 16 October 2015.

Text

Announcement 
S.O. 999(E).—In exercise of the powers conferred by sub-section (2) of section 1 of the Constitution (Ninety-ninth Amendment) Act, 2014, the Central Government hereby appoints the 13th day of April, 2015, as the date on which the said Act shall come into force.

Struck down by Supreme Court of India 
The NJAC act was challenged in Supreme Court by Supreme Court Advocates on Record Association (SCAORA) and others contending that the new law is unconstitutional and it is aimed at hurting the independence of judiciary. After accepting the petition, on October 16, the five-member constitutional bench of Supreme Court headed by the Justice J.S. Kheharwith 4:1 majority has declared the National Judicial Appointments Commission and the 99th Constitutional Amendment act as ‘unconstitutional and void’.

Judgement of the Supreme Court bench 

 The Constitution (Ninety-ninth Amendment) Act, 2014 and the National Judicial Appointments Commission Act, 2014, is declared unconstitutional and void.
 The system of appointment and transfers of Judges higher judiciary, as existing prior to the Constitution (Ninety-ninth Amendment) Act, 2014 (called the “collegium system”), is declared to be operative.
 The clauses provided in the amendment are inadequate to preserve the primacy of the judiciary, a basic feature of the constitution.
 Inclusion of Law Minister in the commission impinged both on the independence of the judiciary and the doctrine of separation of powers between the judiciary and the executive.
 The bench also rejected for reference to a larger Bench, and for reconsideration of the Second and Third Judges cases.
 To consider introduction of appropriate measures, if any, for an improved working of the “collegium system”.

Constitution of India
99